The Hunt for the Bride (German: Die Jagd nach der Braut) is a 1927 German silent film directed by George Jacoby and starring Georg Alexander, Stewart Rome and Elga Brink.

The film's art direction was by Franz Schroedter and Hermann Warm.

Cast
Georg Alexander as Robert Brook  
Paul Otto as Albert Brook, his father 
Stewart Rome as Jeremias Ronald  
Elga Brink as Florence  
Marietta Millner as Elinor Mall  
Jack Trevor as Bill Hoot 
Eugen Burg as Thomas Atkins  
Paula Eberty as Mrs. Booth

References

External links

Films of the Weimar Republic
German silent feature films
Films directed by Georg Jacoby
German black-and-white films